The Collège Saint Joseph in Antoura, Lebanon, is the oldest French school in the Middle East. It was established in 1834 by the Lazarist priests, led by Fr. Andrew Francis. The school's current headmaster is Father Abdo Eid and its student body comprises 5500 students. Located in the valley of Antoura, the campus consists of more than eight buildings with several courts and gardens. Antoura still ranks among the top schools in Lebanon. It is accredited by the French Ministry of Education and has the status of "école homologuée". The high school or "lycée" offers both the Lebanese and French baccalaureate programs with the possibility of a rather challenging intensive double baccalaureate program.

It is classified as a French international school by the AEFE.

The school also accommodates the oldest scouts group in Lebanon. Previously members of the Scouts et Guides de France, the scouts and guides of Saint Joseph Antoura later joined the Scouts du Liban association when it was formed. The group is still one of the largest and most prominent scouts groups of the nation.

Antoura is well known for the visit of French writers Alphonse de Lamartine and Gerard de Nerval, who wrote about the school and the town.

History
Since 1651, local notable Cheikh Abou Nawfal Khazen had been requesting Jesuit fathers to establish a mission on his lands in Antoura. It wasn't until 1773, that their efforts were realized with the arrival of monks from The Lazarist order. In 1834, the apostolic delegate, Monseigneur Auvergne encouraged the transformation of the mission into a teaching college. Antoura's beginnings were quite modest, in October 1834 seven students were enrolled, thus forming the first secondary Francophone school in the Middle East. Over the course of the 19th century, the college developed spectacularly. In 1874, the central building was built. The Left wing opened in 1884 and the big chapel was inaugurated in 1895. The symbol of the school, the tower was built in 1904 and sealed the courtyard beautifully. 

During World War I and the Armenian genocide, the Lazarists were expelled by the Ottomans and the college was transformed into an orphanage where, under the direction of Djemal Pasha and Halide Edib Adıvar, about 1,000 Armenian and 200 Kurdish children were forcefully Turkified. The story of the Turkification of the children during the Armenian genocide is vividly portrayed in Goodbye, Antoura, released in English in 2015 and written by one of the children who were interned at the orphanage.

College attendance saw a resurgence in 1919, counting 350 Students. In 1936, the French Academy awarded the Grand Prix of French Language to the college. In 1970, a Basketball Court was constructed. In 1977, despite the Lebanese Civil War, the Kindergarten building was built. The Centre Lamartine, named after the illustrious French poet who visited the college, is a documentation center which is used by both students and teachers to further their research. In 1982, the boarding school was opened. The college then counted 2,500 students. In 1994, the College turned 160 years old. In 1996, the great chapel was 100 years old, and was completely restored. In 2004, the Tower turned 100 years old. The Saint Joseph Sports center was opened in 2006 and includes a semi-Olympic indoor pool, and diverse sport activities take place there.

Academics
The College Offers 15 years of schooling, starting with three years of pre-school ("Maternelle"), and 12 years of schooling (Grade 1 to 12).
The school follows the standard Lebanese program. Students in grade 9 are required to pass the Brevet examination before joining the Secondary cycle ("high school"). Students graduate after finishing the grade 12 program and successfully passing the Baccalaureate. They are required to select one of four concentrations: Sciences (Life or General), Sociology-Economics or Humanities. The school also offers students the possibility of studying both the French and Lebanese Baccalaureates, in a double intensive program. The selection process for this program is merit-based, and generally requires top 15% ranking in the school. 
The average size of the graduating class in Antoura varies typically between 200 and 250 students. 

Antoura has one of the highest passing rates in the Lebanese and French Baccalaureates, with 98% success in the first session, and more than 99% after the make-up session of the Lebanese Baccalaureate and the oral session of the French Baccalaureate. Most students join one of five major Lebanese universities after graduating: The American University of Beirut, Université Saint Joseph, The Lebanese University, the Lebanese American University, and Notre Dame University Louaize.

Location
The town of Antoura sits on a sloping hill overlooking the Mediterranean Sea at an altitude ranging between 250 and 300m above sea level. The Town is bordered by Zouk Mikael and Zouk Mosbeh to the west, Hrash, Jeita and Ain El Rihani to the east.

Etymology
Antoura derives from Syriac `aïn meaning "fountain" or "spring" and țoura meaning "mountain".

Notable alumni
 Marc Saleh - Big Business Man
Charles Helou President of Lebanon from 1964 to 1970
Sleiman Frangieh - President of Lebanon from 1970 to 1976
René Moawad - President of Lebanon in 1989 (assassinated while in office)
Riad el Solh - First Lebanese Prime Minister after Lebanon's independence from France in 1943
Sabri Hamade - Speaker of the Parliament
Hamid Frangieh - Politician, Minister and Member of Parliament
Kamal Jumblatt - politician, Member of Parliament and Minister, Druze leader and founder of the Progressive Socialist Party
Ziad Baroud -  Interior Minister 2008–2011
Michel Elefteriades - Producer
Ibrahim Najjar - Justice Minister 2008–2011
Romeo Lahoud - Director & Composer
Jawad Boulos - Historian and Politician
Elias Abou Chabake - Poet
Rudy Rahmé- Painter, sculptor and poet
Checri Ganem - Patriot and Poet
May Ziadeh - Poet
Ghassan Tueni - Author, diplomat, journalist, public intellectual
Antoine Abi-Zeid - Attorney, Secretary General, National Bloc Party
Mohammad-Ali Jamalzadeh - One of the most prominent Iranian writers of the 20th century
Youssef Salameh - Minister
Roger Eddé - Politician
Antoine Kazan - Lawyer And Poet
 Bernard Barbour - International  Finance Law Counselor
 Nancy Ajram - Signer and Arab Music Idol
 Maurice Gemayel - Politician
 Mansour Bteich - Politician
 Liliane Tannoury - Journalist

See also
 Education in the Ottoman Empire

Official website

References

French international schools in Lebanon
Educational institutions established in 1834
1834 establishments in the Ottoman Empire